Sai Dhanshika is an Indian actress who predominantly appears in Tamil cinema.

Career 
She starred in several films including  Peranmai (2009), Maanja Velu (2010) and  Nil Gavani Sellathey (2010). Regarding her role in Nil Gavani Sellathey, a reviewer stated that "Among the relatively fresh cast, only Dhansika (Maanja Velu, Peraanmai) makes an impression". She starred as the heroine in Aravaan (2012) and Paradesi. She garnered acclaim for her performance in the latter with a critic noting that "Dhansikaa is as good as ever". Her next film Ya Ya released to negative reviews. Thiranthidu Seese (2015) released to positive reviews with a critic stating that "A ravishing Dhanshika plays Charmi with elan". She also garnered recognition for her portrayal of Rajinikanth's daughter in Kabali (2016) with a critic noting that "Watching Yogi (Dhansikaa) is a delight, given her stylish makeover and ease in fight sequence". For her role in the film, she sported a short hair cut. Her next film Enga Amma Rani (2017), which was set in Malaysia, released to positive reviews with a critic stating that "Sai Dhanshika is pretty much the highlight here: tough, determined, and also vulnerable to grief when the situation demands". Her performance was praised in her subsequent films Uru and Solo. Vizhithiru, Kaathadi, and Kaalakkoothu released to negative reviews. Her Kannada debut Udgharsha (2019) released to positive reviews. Her next film Iruttu released to mixed and Positive reviews. She was cast in Laabam in a negative role. She has also been cast in Yogi Da. The multilingual films Kitna and Vaalujada got stuck in production.

Filmography

Short films and web series

Awards and nominations

References

External links
 
 
 

Actresses from Tamil Nadu
Indian film actresses
Living people
Actresses in Tamil cinema
21st-century Indian actresses
Filmfare Awards South winners
Actresses in Malayalam cinema
Actresses in Kannada cinema
Actresses in Telugu cinema
Place of birth missing (living people)
Year of birth missing (living people)